Gigi Hamilton (born 7 May 1965) is a Swedish singer and songwriter, best known as a member of the popular Swedish pop-groups, Freestyle and later Style.

Biography
Gigi's musical career started as a singer-songwriter in the Swedish 1980s pop-group called Freestyle.
Her first album Fantasi with Freestyle sold Gold and platinum in a short space of time. It still remains popular in Sweden with extensive airplay on the radio; especially the singles: "Vill ha dej", "Fantasi" and "Ögon som glittrar". Freestyle's popularity led to a film role in the Swedish motion picture called G.

In 1982 she released her first solo record  My Coo ca Choo.
Freestyle split in 1983 due to musical differences, but in 1998 Gigi and the former members reformed for the Summer of 1998 to re-record "Fantasi" and "Ögon Som Glittrar" and to release a new compilation album. "Fantasi" became a hit once again and together they made a one-off concert in Stockholm.

When Freestyle disbanded in 1983, Gigi formed Style together with former Freestyle band members Tommy Ekman and Christer Sandelin. Style became successful in Scandinavia.

Hamilton has participated in the Swedish Melodifestivalen three times with Style. First in 1986, with their song "Dover-Calais"; although finishing third, "Dover-Calais" became a hit throughout Scandinavia, 
Then in 1987 with their song "Hand i hand" finishing sixth and in 2003 (reunited again after splitting in 1989 due to musical differences) with their song "Stay the Night".

Gigi released her first solo album Gigi Hamilton in 1991, with the singles: "Joy & Pain (In this Wild, Wild, Wild World", "Bitter Sweet Love", "Angels With Filthy Wings" and "How's the World Treating You"

She currently lives in London after living in Tokyo for many years.
She enjoys going home to Sweden to participate in Swedish TV shows like SVTs and Så ska det låta, as well as playing nostalgia tours with both Style and as solo artist.

Discography

Freestyle albums 
 Fantasi (1981) No. 1
 Modiga Agenter (1982) No. 13
 10 (1990) No. 47

Freestyle Compilations 
 Freestyle's Bästa (1986)
 Guldkorn-Den Kompletta Samlingen (1998) No. 2
 Golden Hits/2CD (1998)

Freestyle Singles 
 Take Me Home (1980)
 Running Away (1980)
 Vill ha dej/I Want You (1980) No. 1
 Fantasi (1981) No. 13
 Rider Omkring (1981)
 Nära Dej (1981)
 Bubblar (1981)
 Är Det Värt... (1981)
 One More Ride/Fantasy (1981)
 Ögon Som Glittrar (1982) No. 3
 Att Leka Med Känslor (1982)
 Modiga Agenter/Vill Du Ha En Del Av Min Sommar (1982) No. 13
 Mission Impossible/Hard To Handle (1982)
 Fingers in Motion (1983)
 Musiken Gör Mig Vild/Nattens Dockor (1983)
 Fantasi/10 (1991)
 C&N Medley '98/DJ Promotion (1998)
 Fantasi '98 (1998) No. 37
 Ögon Som Glittrar '98 (1998)

Style albums 
 So Chic (1983) SWE No. 32
 Visioner (1985)
 Heaven No 7 (1986) SWE No. 3
 Daylight Robbery (1987) SWE No. 7
 12 bästa (1987)
 Question of Time (1988) SWE No. 4
 Samlade hits (2003) SWE No. 7

Style Singles 
 Love Is Knocking on My Door/Längtar tillbaks till dig (1983)
 Telefon (1984)
 Du och jag (1985)
 Vision av kärlek (1985)
 Telephone (1985) U.S. DANCE No. 16
 Give Me a Night to Remember/På jakt (efter guld som glimmar) (1986)
 Dover-Calais (1986) SWE No. 1
 Följ mig (1986)
 Heaven No 7 (1986)
 Shine On (1986)
 Hand i hand (1987) SWE No. 20
 Run for Your Life (1987) SWE No. 4
 Daylight Robbery (1987)
 New World (1987)
 Empty Bed (1988) SWE No. 4
 It's a Secret (1988) SWE No. 3
 Question of Time (1988)
 Sentimental (1988)
 Empty Bed (International release) (1989)
 Stay the Night (2003)

Solo album
Gigi Hamilton – 1991

Solo Singles
Joy &Pain (In this Wild, Wild, Wild World – 1991
Bitter Sweet – 1991
Angels With Filthy Wings – 1991
How's The World Treating You – 1991

References 
 Freestyle discography in Hitparad

External links 
 

Swedish songwriters
Swedish singer-songwriters
Swedish women singers
Living people
Musical groups established in 1980
Musical groups established in 1983
Musical groups disestablished in 1989
Swedish people of Jamaican descent
Year of birth missing (living people)
English-language singers from Sweden
Freestyle (Swedish band)
Melodifestivalen contestants of 2003
Melodifestivalen contestants of 1987
Melodifestivalen contestants of 1986